David Jerard Moss (born September 9, 1983) is an American professional basketball player for Germani Brescia of the Lega Basket Serie A (LBA). He is a  shooting guard-small forward.

Collegiate career
Moss attended Thornwood High School in South Holland, Illinois, USA. There he played basketball, soccer, tennis, and track & field. He played basketball at Indiana State University, where he played with the Indiana State Sycamores in the Missouri Valley Conference. While there, he was named Conference Freshman of the Year, and earned All-Conference Team honors all four years. He finished as the school's sixth all-time leading scorer, with 1,562 points career points scored; currently, he ranks seventh.

Professional career
Moss went undrafted by an NBA team and started his professional career in the 2006–07 season in the Polish League, playing with Polpak Swiecie. Following that season, he played in the NBA Summer League with the Atlanta Hawks. Not able to make the team, he went back to Europe to play in the Italian Second Division, with Aurora Jesi, during the 2007-08 season. With Jesi, he won the Italian Second Division Cup.

The following season, 2008–09, he played with Teramo Basket in the Italian First Division, and enjoyed great success there, finishing second in the league MVP voting to Terrell McIntyre. After playing in the 2009 NBA Summer League with the Portland Trail Blazers, he signed a three-year contract with the Italian club Montepaschi Siena, but he first joined Virtus Bologna on a sports loan, until the end of the contract's first season.

With Montepaschi Siena, Moss helped the team to win eight national domestic titles; winning three Italian League championships (2011, 2012, 2013), three Italian Cup titles (2011, 2012, 2013), and two Italian Supercup titles (2010, 2011). He was also named an Italian League All-Star for the 2010–11 and 2011–12 seasons.

On July 29, 2013, Moss officially signed a two-year contract with Emporio Armani Milano.

On March 16, 2016, Moss signed with Basket Brescia Leonessa, a Serie A2 Basket team for the rest of  the 2015–16 season. At the end of the season, the club was promoted in Serie A after 24 years.

On July 2, 2016, Moss re-signed with Basket Brescia Leonessa. On February 2, 2018, he signed a two-year contract extension with Brescia.
As of February 23, 2022; Moss remains the Team Captain of Brescia.

Career statistics

Euroleague

|-
| style="text-align:left;"| 2010–11
| style="text-align:left;"| Montepaschi
| 22 || 20 || 21.4 || .477 || .452 || .806 || 2.4 || 1.8 || 1.4 || .4 || 7.6 || 7.4
|-
| style="text-align:left;"| 2011–12
| style="text-align:left;"| Montepaschi
| 20 || 15 || 22.7 || .455 || .420 || .870 || 2.5 || 1.1 || .9 || .3 || 8.2 || 6.8
|-
| style="text-align:left;"| 2012–13
| style="text-align:left;"| Montepaschi
| 24 || 24 || 30.8 || .420 || .396 || .875 || 4.0 || 1.5 || .7 || .0 || 9.8 || 8.7
|-
| style="text-align:left;"| 2013–14
| style="text-align:left;"| Milano
| 26 || 16 || 24.9 || .451 || .364 || .806 || 3.6 || 1.5 || 1.0 || .1 || 7.3 || 7.6
|-
| style="text-align:left;"| 2014–15
| style="text-align:left;"| Milano
| 23 || 13 || 21.1 || .398 || .333 || .773 || 3.1 || 1.2 || .7 || .1 || 5.0 || 5.0
|-
| style="text-align:left;"| 2015–16
| style="text-align:left;"| Milano
| 23 || 13 || 21.1 || .398 || .333 || .773 || 3.1 || 1.2 || .7 || .1 || 5.0 || 5.0
|- class="sortbottom"
| style="text-align:left;"| Career
| style="text-align:left;"|
| 202 || 98 || 27.3 || .463 || .403 || .794 || 4.2 || 1.4 || .9 || .3 || 7.6 || 10.2

References

External links
 David Moss at draftexpress.com
 David Moss at eurobasket.com
 David Moss at euroleague.net
 David Moss at legabasket.it 
 
 

1983 births
Living people
American expatriate basketball people in Italy
American expatriate basketball people in Poland
American men's basketball players
Basketball players from Illinois
Basket Brescia Leonessa players
Indiana State Sycamores men's basketball players
Lega Basket Serie A players
Mens Sana Basket players
Olimpia Milano players
Shooting guards
Small forwards
Teramo Basket players
Virtus Bologna players